Walls (stylized, WALLS) is the sixth live album from Gateway Worship. It was released on October 2, 2015.

Critical reception

Awarding the album three stars at CCM Magazine, Matt Conner states, "...the set list for Walls is loaded for an album that focuses on tearing down the walls we encounter, both personal and corporate. Walls is, more than anything, an invitation and longing for God’s love and grace to set the listener free". Amanda Furbeck, indicating in a four star review for Worship Leader, says, "Walls exceeds expectations with its impressive roster of talent musicians, fierce energy and themes of God's unchanging love for his people interspersed with the hope of tearing down walls that keep people for a relationship with God and each other."

Signaling in a seven out of ten review at Cross Rhythms, Brendan O'Regan describes, "Producers Walker Beach, Josh Alltop and Miguel Noyola have captured the spirit of live performance but maintained a high quality sound." Mark Ryan, giving the album four star from New Release Today, writes, "The Gateway Worship team has put together a remarkable live worship project that will encourage you in your own worship times, while also providing the church with songs that create an indelible impact on those who sing them." Rating the album four stars by The Christian Beat, Lauren McLean describes, "Each song could be a stand out single in its own right and each track is compelling in its own way."

Awards and accolades
This album was No. 17, on the Worship Leader'''s Top 20 Albums of 2015 list.

The song, "Grace That Won't Let Go", was No. 16, on the Worship Leader'''s Top 20 Songs of 2015 list.

Track listing

Chart performance

References

2015 live albums
Gateway Worship live albums